Nicholas Smith (born 6 August 1946) is a New Zealand former cricketer. He played first-class cricket for Auckland and Otago between 1969 and 1972.

See also
 List of Otago representative cricketers
 List of Auckland representative cricketers

References

External links
 

1946 births
Living people
New Zealand cricketers
Auckland cricketers
Otago cricketers
Cricketers from Dunedin